Acalolepta antenor is a species of beetle in the family Cerambycidae. It was described by Newman in 1842. The typical form is known from the Philippines, but numerous subspecies are widespread in Indonesia, Moluccas, Micronesia, New Guinea, Australia, Solomon Islands and Samoa.

References

 F. Vitali The Acalolepta-species of the group antenor (Coleoptera, Cerambycidae)

Acalolepta
Beetles described in 1842